Ben Winston (born 1981) is a British producer and director who established the production company Fulwell 73 with Gabe Turner, Ben Turner, and Leo Pearlman. He is co-executive producer of the CBS talk showThe Late Late Show with James Corden alongside Rob Crabbe and Mike Gibbons and the show's segments "Carpool Karaoke" and "Drop the Mic". He has collaborated with a number of artists, most notably One Direction, JLS, Robbie Williams, Gary Barlow, Kacey Musgraves, and James Corden. Winston has produced and directed a number of pop culture oriented films, documentaries, concerts and music videos. He has also produced Brit Awards from 2011 to 2014. More recently he was a co-producer of the Grammy Awards and Tony Awards.

Personal life
Winston is the son of Lord Winston and Lira Helen Feigenbaum (now The Lady Winston). He has two siblings: Joel and Tanya. He is Jewish.

Winston studied at the University of Leeds, graduating in Broadcasting in 2004. He is married to Meredith Winston. Together, they have two daughters. The eldest's godfather is Harry Styles.

Career
Winston started at Fulwell 73 by co-producing in the Hands of the Gods (Lionsgate) in 2007. Since he has produced and directed shows including The Michael McIntyre Chat Show (BBC1) Robbie Williams: One Night at The Palladium (BBC1), This is Justin Bieber (ITV1), One Direction: A Year In The Making, and the seven-hour live streamed  show 1D Day. He also produced and directed Gary Barlow: On Her Majesty's Service(2012).

He has worked with his friend James Corden on many productions including James Corden's World Cup Live (ITV1), When Corden Met Barlow (BBC1), When Robbie Met James (Sky One). For Red Nose Day on BBC1, he directed and co-wrote sketches for Gavin & Stacey. Ben co-directed the 3D documentary movie, JLS: Eyes Wide Open which opened on over 400 screens across the UK. At the time it was the biggest grossing music cinema release of all time in the UK, but was beaten by the next film he produced, the One Direction's film One Direction: This Is Us for Columbia Pictures.

As a commercial director, his advert for "A League Of  Own" won the gold award at Berlin Pro Max Awards in 2011. He directed the 2011 Christmas Campaign for BBC One, "Consider Yourself One of Us" as well as the award-winning campaign for the Sport Relief mile. His music videos for One Direction has won a Brit Award for British Video of the Year for four consecutive years.

In 2014, he directed When Corden Met Barlow which aired on BBC One. The show included a 6-minute 45 second Carpool Karaoke segment in the documentary with singer Gary Barlow of the band Take That. James Corden explained that "Ben Winston and I always thought there was something very joyful about someone very, very famous singing their songs in an ordinary situation. We just had this idea: Los Angeles, traffic, the carpool lane — maybe this is something we could pull off." Later on Carpool Karaoke was included as a regular featured segment on The Late Late Show with James Corden and other specials. That same year, Winston also became an executive producer on The X Factor.

Awards

Won
2016: Primetime Emmy Award for "Outstanding Interactive Program" for The Late Late Show with James Corden co-won with James Corden (producer/host), Rob Crabbe (executive producer) and Adam Abramson (director of digital)
2016: Primetime Emmy Award for "Outstanding Variety Special" category for The Late Late Show Carpool Karaoke Primetime Special. Award co-won with Rob Crabbe (executive producer), Mike Gibbons (co-executive producer), Sheila Rogers, Michael Kaplan, Jeff Kopp and Josie Cliff (supervising producers) and James Corden (producer/host).

Nominated
2016: Primetime Emmy Award for "Outstanding Variety Talk Series" for The Late Late Show with James Corden co-nominated with Rob Crabbe (executive producer), Mike Gibbons (co-executive producer), Sheila Rogers, Michael Kaplan, Jeff Kopp and Josie Cliff (supervising producers)
2017: Primetime Emmy Awards for "Outstanding Writing for a Variety Special" for The 70th Annual Tony Awards (2016). Co-nominated with Dave Boone (writer), Mike Gibbons, Lauren Greenberg, Ian Karmel, Justin Shanes (special materials)
2017: PGA Award for "Outstanding Producer of Live Entertainment & Talk Television" for The Late Late Show with James Corden. Co-nomination alongside Rob Crabbe, Mike Gibbons, Amy Ozols, Sheila Rogers, Michael Kaplan, Jeff Kopp, James Longman, Josie Cliff and James Corden

Filmography
Director
2011: JLS: Eyes Wide Open 3D (Documentary)
2011: James Corden: May I Have Your Attention, Please? (Video short)
2011: One Direction: A Year in the Making (TV Movie documentary)
2012: Gary Barlow: On Her Majesty's Service (TV Movie documentary)
2012: When Robbie Met James (TV special)
2014: When Corden Met Barlow (TV special)
2021: Friends: The Reunion (TV special)

Producer
2007: In the Hands of the Gods (Documentary, producer)
2007: Slave Labour (Documentary short, executive producer) 
2010: This Is JLS (TV special, producer) 
2011: Brit Awards 2011 (TV special, producer) 
2011: One Direction: A Year in the Making (TV documentary, producer) 
2012: A Very JLS Christmas (TV special, executive producer) 
2012: Freddie Flintoff: Hidden Side of Sport (TV documentary film, associate producer) 
2012: The Brit Awards 2012 (TV special, producer)
2012: Gary Barlow: On Her Majesty's Service (TV documentary, executive producer) 
2012: Flintoff: From Lord's to the Ring (TV Series, associate producer) 
2012: When Robbie Met James (TV special, executive producer) 
2013: The Brit Awards 2013 (TV Special, producer) 
2013: One Direction: This Is Us (Documentary, producer) 
2013: The Class of '92 (Documentary, associate producer)
2013: Robbie Williams One Night at the Palladium (TV special, executive producer) 
2014: Gary Barlow Big Ben Bash Live (TV special, executive producer) 
2014: The Brit Awards 2014 (TV Special, producer) 
2014: The Michael McIntyre Chat Show (TV Mini-Series, executive producer for several episodes)
2014: The X Factor UK (executive producer)
2014: When Corden Met Barlow (TV special, executive producer)
2014: The Guvnors (associate producer) 
2014: One Direction: Where We Are – The Concert Film (Documentary, executive producer) 
2015: American Express Unstaged: Disclosure (Short, executive producer)
2015: One Direction the London Sessions (TV special documentary, executive producer) 
2015: Take That: These Days on Tour (TV special documentary, associate producer)
2015–present: The Late Late Show with James Corden (TV Series, executive producer)
2016: Jimmy Carr: Funny Business (Video documentary, associate producer)
2016: The 70th Annual Tony Awards (TV Special, producer)
2017: Carpool Karaoke (TV Series, executive producer)
2017: 59th Annual Grammy Awards (TV Special, producer)
2017: Harry Styles: Behind the Album (Documentary, executive producer)
2017: Forbidden Games: The Justin Fashanu Story (Documentary, associate producer)
2018: Bruno Mars: 24K Magic Live at the Apollo (co-executive producer)
2018: 60th Annual Grammy Awards (TV Special, producer)
2019: 61st Annual Grammy Awards (TV Special, executive producer)
2019: The 73rd Annual Tony Awards (TV Special, producer)
2019: The Kacey Musgraves Christmas Show (TV Special, executive producer)
2020: 62nd Annual Grammy Awards (TV Special, executive producer)
2020: Ben Platt Live from Radio City Music Hall (TV Special, executive producer)
2020: Shawn Mendes: In Wonder (Documentary, producer)
2021: 63rd Annual Grammy Awards (TV Special, executive producer)
2021: Adele One Night Only (CBS special, executive producer)
2021: An Audience With Adele (ITV special, executive producer)
2022: The Kardashians (TV series, executive producer)

References

External links

English film directors
English film producers
British Jews
Living people
Alumni of the University of Leeds
Sons of life peers
Year of birth missing (living people)
21st-century Jews
Primetime Emmy Award winners